Muslim Town may refer to:

 Muslim Town, Karachi, Sindh, Pakistan
 Muslim Town, Lahore, Punjab, Pakistan